Santa Maria a Monte is a comune in the Province of Pisa in the Italian region of Tuscany.

Geography
The main frazioni are the villages of Cerretti, Montecalvoli, San Donato and Tavolaia.

History
Famous for its military strategic importance (the hilly position made it more defendable against enemy attacks), Santa Maria a Monte has always been disputed between several Tuscan cities. As a matter of fact, Santa Maria a Monte passed from the influence of Lucca under the influence of Florence and, in the end, it became part of the Pisa territory.
A famous landmark is Casa Carducci, where the Italian poet Giosuè Carducci is said to have spent his childhood.

Around Falorni there is a large portion of woods and cultivated areas, especially with olives. The place is situated in the low woody hills called Cerbaie. The only business situated in the village is a restaurant.

Sister cities
 Fontvieille, France, since 1991
 Tardajos, Spain
 Rabé de las Calzadas, Spain

References

External links

 Official website

Cities and towns in Tuscany